Liza Essers is the owner and director of Goodman Gallery in South Africa, established in 1966.

Career

After receiving her Bachelor of Commerce in Economics, Essers worked as a strategic consultant for the leading global professional services company Accenture as well as in private equity where she rose to prominence in the commercial and financial sector of South Africa.

Prior to purchasing Goodman Gallery in 2008, Essers was an independent art advisor and curator specializing in the conceptualization, development and production of visual art and film projects. She was also the co-executive producer of the South African film, Tsotsi (2005), the first African film to win an Academy Award (Best Foreign Language Picture, 2006). She also produced a documentary film along with Catherine Meyburgh titled Kentridge and Dumas in Conversation, which talks about the real life stories of contemporary artists William Kentridge and Marlene Dumas.

Goodman Gallery

In her early 30s, Essers worked as an independent curator and film producer. Her interest in documentary filmmaking came from its closeness to contemporary art. Her passion for contemporary art stemmed from its ability to effect social change. In an interview, Essers has credited her experiences as the inspiration for her desire "to work in the contemporary art world with artists who make work that can force shifts in thinking."

Essers took over Goodman Gallery in 2008. Since acquiring the gallery, Essers shifted from showing artists primarily from South Africa to working with artists from the rest of the continent, bringing in artists who actualize social change. Her ambition is to "embrace the shared histories and narratives of South Africa with other parts of the continent and the world."

Under her directorship, 26 new artists, both established and emerging, from various parts of the Africa and beyond have joined Goodman Gallery. These include Ghada Amer, Candice Breitz, Kudzanai Chiurai, Mounir Fatmi, Alfredo Jaar, Liza Lou, Hank Willis Thomas, Adam Broomberg & Oliver Chanarin. The most recent additions to the gallery's stable are Shirin Neshat, Kiluanji Kia Henda and revolutionary South African performance collective The Brother Moves On.

In 2012, a scandal broke out in the gallery over a painting with a naked president.

References

Living people
South African businesspeople
South African women artists
South African film producers
Year of birth missing (living people)